Cloverdale may refer to the following communities in West Virginia:
Cloverdale, Monroe County, West Virginia
Cloverdale, Pleasants County, West Virginia